Deh-e Khatib Jadid (also Romanized as Deh-e Khaţīb Jadīd; also known as Deh-e Khaţīb and Deh Khaţīb) is a village in Keybar Rural District, Jolgeh Zozan District, Khaf County, Razavi Khorasan Province, Iran. At the 2006 census, its population was 467, in 102 families.

References 

Populated places in Khaf County